Jessica Lea Mayfield (born August 27, 1989) is an American singer-songwriter from Kent, Ohio, United States. She is known for her ominous song writing, with a plaintive minimalist style that draws on both country and rock music.

Early years
Mayfield first performed with her family bluegrass band One Way Rider at the age of 8. They began touring as a family band, boarding a 1956 tour bus (once belonging to Bill Monroe, Kitty Wells, and Ernest Tubb) and headed south from Ohio to Tennessee. At age 11, Mayfield began playing guitar and writing songs.

Studio work

White Lies
At age 15, Mayfield recorded her first album White Lies under the moniker "Chittlin" produced by her brother David Mayfield, printing only a few hundred copies.  One of those copies fell into the hands of Dan Auerbach of The Black Keys.  After an introduction, Mayfield and Auerbach hit the studio, laying the foundation of her debut album With Blasphemy So Heartfelt.

With Blasphemy So Heartfelt
Mayfield's first LP was the September 16, 2008 release With Blasphemy So Heartfelt.  The album was produced by Auerbach and recorded over a two-year span in his home studio in Akron.  With Blasphemy So Heartfelt features Mayfield on acoustic guitar and vocals, Auerbach on a variety of instrumentation, and Mayfield’s brother David on upright bass.  Dr. Dog’s Scott McMicken and Frank McElroy provide vocal harmonies on the track “I’m Not Lonely Anymore.”  Says Auerbach of the recording experience, “I think she’s dark and moody in a mysterious way, not unlike Nick Cave and the Bad Seeds.”  He adds, “I’m just always really excited to make music with her.”

With Blasphemy So Heartfelt debuted with quite a buzz around it.  Pitchfork Media gave the record a rating of 8.2 out of 10. Online magazine Blurt named With Blasphemy the Best Album of 2008 and gave Mayfield the title of Best New Artist of 2008.  The album's opening track "Kiss Me Again" was featured on The CW's hit series Gossip Girl on February 2, 2009, and "Bible Days" was featured on CBS's CSI: NY.  "For Today" is featured on the Starbucks compilation Have You Heard?: Winter '09. Mayfield's cover of the Buddy Holly song "Words of Love" is featured on the Starbucks compilation Sweetheart: Our Favorite Artists Sing Their Favorite Love Songs.

Tell Me
Mayfield released her second LP Tell Me on February 8, 2011.

Make My Head Sing
Mayfield released her alternative rock album "Make My Head Sing" in 2014. Pitchfork said, "Jessica Lea Mayfield’s third album opens with the loud, percussive crunch and grind of an electric guitar, thudding loudly and precipitously— Co-producing with her bass player and husband Jesse Newport, Mayfield keeps the sound loose and roomy, preserving the effect of three musicians huddled in a cramped practice space. There’s something certainly compelling about this raw, minimalist sound." 
The album is her first without Auerbach's influence.

Seth Avett and Jessica Lea Mayfield Sing Elliott Smith
Mayfield and Seth Avett of the Avett Brothers released an album of Elliott Smith cover songs in 2015.

Collaborations
In 2007, Mayfield lent her voice to the track "Things Ain't Like They Used To Be" on The Black Keys' album Attack & Release produced by Danger Mouse, making her the first guest vocalist to appear on any record released by The Black Keys.

Mayfield collaborated with Auerbach again on his 2009 debut solo release Keep It Hid, lending her vocals to the track "When the Night Comes".

Sorry is Gone
On September 29, 2017, Mayfield's fourth studio LP Sorry Is Gone was released by ATO Records: with the exception of the song "Offa My Hands", which was written and produced by Patrick Damphier, who has worked with The Mynabirds and The Arcs, the album was produced by John Agnello, who has worked with Dinosaur Jr and Sonic Youth, and includes appearances by Seth Avett and Steve Shelley of Sonic Youth. Sorry is Gone was another nod to Mayfield's grunge-alternative influences, while incorporating some alt-country and pop elements as well.

The deeply personal album chronicles Mayfield's years-long journey as a survivor of domestic abuse, and separation from her abusive husband: "I feel like it’s almost my duty and my responsibility to advocate for this subject. Because if I really want things to change and I want women to be treated more fairly, then hiding my own experiences isn’t going to help anyone."

Touring
In addition to opening for many artists, including The Black Keys, The Avett Brothers, Cake, Band of Horses, Ryan Adams, Ray LaMontagne, and Jay Farrar (Son Volt, Uncle Tupelo), Mayfield has frequently toured as a headliner, and performed at the Blossom Music Center in Cuyahoga Falls, Ohio as part of A Prairie Home Companion in July 2010.

Discography

Studio albums
2008: With Blasphemy So Heartfelt
2011: Tell Me
2014: Make My Head Sing
2017: Sorry Is Gone

Singles
"Kiss Me Again" (2008)
"Our Hearts Are Wrong" (2010)
"I Want to Love You" (2014)
"Sorry is Gone" (2017)
"Meadow" (2017)
"Emotional Abandonment" (2020)
"Can You Feel It?" (2021)

EPs
2006: White Lies
2010: Live (10", EP)

Collaborations and appearances
2008: The Black Keys: Attack & Release
2009: Sweetheart: Our Favorite Artists Sing Their Favorite Love Songs (Various Artists)
2009: Dan Auerbach: Keep It Hid:
2011: My Favorite Gifts: Christmas Album: (Various Artists)
2011: Newermind: "Lounge Act"
2013: The Avett Brothers: Magpie and the Dandelion
2013: High Cotton: A Tribute To Alabama (Various Artists)
2015: Seth Avett and Jessica Lea Mayfield Sing Elliott Smith
2022: Alex G: God Save the Animals:

References

External links
Jessica Lea Mayfield
 Flavorwire's top 15 Nirvana Covers

Living people
People from Kent, Ohio
Singer-songwriters from Ohio
1989 births
21st-century American singers